Grease 'n' Gravy is an album by saxophonist Willis Jackson which was recorded in 1963 and released on the Prestige label.

Reception

Allmusic awarded the album 2½ stars stating "It's respectable, not too cool and not too hot early-'60s organ-sax jazz, with Wilson's organ and the still-teenaged Martino's guitar as vital to the success of the date as Jackson's tenor sax is".

Track listing 
All compositions by Willis Jackson except where noted.
 "Brother Elijah" (Jackson, Wade Marcus, William "Mickey" Stevenson) – 5:13  
 "Doot Dat" – 7:23  
 "Stompin' at the Savoy" (Benny Goodman, Andy Razaf, Edgar Sampson, Chick Webb) – 3:13  
 "Gra-a-avy" – 11:42  
 "Grease"- 7:21  
  
Recorded at Van Gelder Studio in Englewood Cliffs, New Jersey on May 23 (tracks 1 & 2), & May 24 (tracks 3-5), 1963

Personnel 
Willis Jackson – tenor saxophone
Frank Robinson – trumpet
Carl Wilson – organ
Pat Martino – guitar
Leonard Gaskin – bass (tracks 3-5)
Joe Hadrick  – drums

References 

Willis Jackson (saxophonist) albums
1963 albums
Prestige Records albums
Albums recorded at Van Gelder Studio
Albums produced by Ozzie Cadena